Percrocuta is an extinct genus of hyena-like feliform carnivores. It lived in Europe, Asia, and Africa, during the Miocene epoch.

Characteristics
With a maximum length of 1.50 m (5 ft), Percrocuta was much bigger than its modern relatives, but is not smaller than a 1.8 meters length for female lion. Like the spotted hyena, Percrocuta had a robust skull and powerful jaws. Similar to modern hyenids, its hind legs were shorter than the front legs, resulting in a characteristic sloping back.

Classification
Percrocuta was introduced as a genus of Percrocutidae in 1938. Percrocuta'''s relation to the family Hyaenidae was debated until 1985, when Percrocuta, Dinocrocuta, Belbus, and Allohyaena were accepted as the four genera of Percrocutidae. More recent evidence, however, has shown that Belbus and Allohyaena at least, are not percrocutids.

Fossil evidenceP. abessalomi is known only from a skull, two mandibles, and two teeth. These fossils were all collected from the Belomechetskaja, Georgia area and date from the sixth Mammal Neogene (MN) zone. This species is the best known of the family Percrocutidae. P. miocenica'' is known from only a few mandibles, found in Serbia, Bosnia and Herzegovina and Turkey. These fossils are also dated to MN 6.

References

Miocene feliforms
Miocene mammals of Asia
Miocene mammals of Africa
Fossil taxa described in 1938
Prehistoric carnivoran genera
Prehistoric feliforms